EK, Ek or ek may refer to:

Businesses and organizations
 Eastern Kentucky Railway (with reporting mark EK), now-defunct railway
 Eastman Kodak (formerly with NYSE ticker symbol EK), US-based photography company, formerly 
 Ek Commando Knife Co., US knife manufacturer
 Elinkeinoelämän keskusliitto, Confederation of Finnish Industries
 Emirates (airline) (IATA airline designator EK)
 European Kindred, prison and street gang

People
 Anders Ek (1916–1979), Swedish film actor
 Daniel Ek (born 1983), Swedish businessman, creator and CEO of Spotify 
 Malin Ek (born 1945), Swedish actress, daughter of Anders Ek
 Mats Ek (born 1945), dancer, choreographer and stage director
 Phil Ek, American record producer, engineer, and mixer
 Torbjörn Ek (1949-2010), Swedish bandy & football player and manager
 Eknath (ca.533-ca.1599), Ek Nāth, or Eka Nātha, Indian Hindu saint, philosopher, and poet
 Ek Boonsawad (born 1988), Thai windsurfer
 Ek Rangsiroj (born 1974), Thai actor
 Ix Ek' Naah, Maya queen of the Kaan kingdom in Campeche, Mexico

Places
 East Kilbride, town in South Lanarkshire, Scotland
 Ek Park, cricket ground in Kitwe, Zambia
 Enchanted Kingdom, theme park in the Philippines

Science
 Exakelvin, unit of temperature, abbreviated as EK
 Kinetic Energy, in physics, abbreviated as Ek

Other uses
 ek, the number 'one' in Hindi (Devanagari numerals)
 Ektara, ek tar, or ik tar, "One String," Indian musical instrument
 Mitsubishi eK, Japanese kei car

See also
 Eric Kirkham Cole Limited (EKCO), a British electronics company
 ECC (disambiguation)
 Eck (disambiguation)
 Ekk (disambiguation)
 EC (disambiguation)
 EQ (disambiguation)